Mahmudvand may refer to:

 Mahmudvand, Hamadan, a village
 Mahmudvand, Lorestan, a village
 Shurab-e Mahmudvand, a village
 Veysian, a city